Fussballclub Bern (FC Bern) is a football team from Bern, the capital city of Switzerland, who currently play in the Gruppe 1, Bern/Jura canton of 2. Liga.

In 1921, the club won the Och Cup (that was considered as the former Swiss Cup). The Och Cup ran only for two years. In 1925, in a single game, FC Bern won the cup against the other winner of the Och Cup.

 
Association football clubs established in 1894
Football clubs in Switzerland
Football clubs in Bern
1894 establishments in Switzerland